George Albert Young, FRSC (1878–1947) was a Canadian geologist who was Chief Geologist of the Canadian Geological Survey. He was President of the Royal Society of Canada in 1935–1936, in succession to fellow geologist Reginald Walter Brock, who died in a plane accident.

References 

 https://mineralogicalrecord.com/new_biobibliography/young-george-albert/
 
 "Chief Geologist Dies", The Gazette, 9 June 1947, p. 13

1878 births
1947 deaths
Fellows of the Royal Society of Canada
20th-century Canadian geologists
Geological Survey of Canada personnel